Puthiya Theerangal is a 2012 Indian Malayalam-language film directed by Sathyan Anthikad, produced by Anto Joseph and written by Benny P Nayarambalam. It stars Nivin Pauly, Namitha Pramod and Nedumudi Venu. The music is composed by Ilaiyaraaja.

Plot
The film is happening by the seaside. The story is focused on the life of a young girl named Thamara, who lives on her own at the shore, after the death of her parents. Sometime later she finds an old man and she feels like having got her father back. The story dwells on the bond between the two and how that changes in the presence of the few new people who land up and start to live on the banks of the sea.

Cast
 Nivin Pauly as Mohanan Maash
 Namitha Pramod as Thamara
 Nedumudi Venu as Advocate Immanuel (Original Name)/Kurian Paulose/Kumara Panickker (K.P.)
Malavika Nair as Minikkutty (Adv. Immanuels Daughter)
 Innocent as Father Michael
 Sidhartha Siva as Appachan
 Mahima as Appachan's wife
 Siddique as Sankaran 
 S.P.Sreekumar
 Krishnabhaskar Mangalasserri
 Molly Aunty
Dharmajan

Production
Puthiya Theerangal is produced by Anto Joseph under the banner of Aan Mega Media and scripted by Benny P Nayarambalam. Audiography was done by M. R. Rajakrishnan.

Soundtrack

The soundtrack will be composed by Ilaiyaraaja, with lyrics penned by Kaithapram. The album consists of three songs. The audio rights of the film were acquired by Mathrubhumi Music. The album was launched on 9 September 2012 at Kochi. The soundtrack received generally positive reviews from music critics. "Rajagopuram" song was widely appreciated and the pick of the album.

Reception
Puthiya Theerangal received mixed reviews upon release with most critics complaining that it is a typical Sathyan Anthikad film with nothing new to offer. Sify.com gives the verdict "Disappointing" and says, "Puthiya Theerangal has nothing new about it and ends up as a meek affair. With clichéd situations and half-baked characters, the film is a lazy effort from one of Kerala’s most popular directors ever." Paresh C Palicha of Rediff.com says Puthiya Theerangal has some good performances but in the end it leaves us with mixed feelings. He rated the film . Oneindia.in was somewhat impressed with the film. In a review which rates the film , its critic comments that the film "spells the same 'Sathyan Anthikkad' magic". it.flopped

Accolades

References

External links
 

2012 films
2010s Malayalam-language films
Films shot in Alappuzha
Films directed by Sathyan Anthikad
Films scored by Ilaiyaraaja